Newnham is a village and parish in Hampshire, England. At the 2011 census it had a population of 518. A large portion of its land is arable, cultivated fields and scattered woodland leading towards the Basingstoke Canal and part of the Eversley/Stratfield Saye/Tylney Park slightly scattered, ancient forest/woodland. These features skirt the north and south of the area, whereas more urban areas skirt the east and, after Old Basing, the west.

Local government
Newnham is a civil parish with an elected parish council. The parish is in: Basingstoke and Deane District Council and equally Hampshire County Council. All three councils are responsible for different aspects of local government.

Demography and housing
In 2011, 49 of its usual residents, per the census of that year, were in communal establishments such as care homes or barracks. The rest were in the more common catch-all category of "households".

Of the 229 dwellings in 2011, 3 were terraced houses, 6 were flats, 60 were caravans or other mobile or temporary structures.  The rest were houses (not terraced).

Notable people
Malcolm Erskine, 17th Earl of Buchan (1930-2022), had his main home at Newnham House.

Further reading
 Nigel Bell Newnham: A History of the Parish and its Church 2004 (available from the church)

References

External links

Newnham